The Maria Filotti is a theatre in Brăila, Romania.

The theatre was built in 1896 as "Teatrul Rally". In 1919, it was renamed "Teatrul Comunal" ("The Communal Theatre"), in 1949, "Teatrul del Stat Brăila – Galați" ("The State Theater of Brăila – Galați"), and in 1969, it acquired its present name, in honour of the Romanian actress, Maria Filotti (1883–1956).

The theatre has 369 seats.

References

External links

Official site

Event venues established in 1896
Maria Filotti
Buildings and structures in Brăila
1896 establishments in Romania
19th-century architecture in Romania